Alone is the debut extended play by South Korean girl group Sistar. It was released on April 12, 2012 by Starship Entertainment and distributed by LOEN Entertainment. A song of the same name was released as a title track with an accompanying music video.

The EP was a commercial success peaking at number 3 on the Gaon Album Chart. The EP has sold over 17,802 physical copies as of 2012.

Background and release
"I Choose to Love You", a solo song by Sistar member Hyolyn, was digitally released on January 19, 2012, as part of the soundtrack for Sarangeul Boda 2 (사랑을 보다2).  It reached number 2 on the Gaon Digital Singles Chart for the week and number 3 for the month.  The song "Alone", the title track of the EP, was produced and written by Brave Brothers. They also produced and wrote title songs from the group's other EPs, most notably "Push Push", "Shady Girl", "How Dare You", "Ma Boy" and "So Cool".

The music video of "Alone" was released on April 12, 2012, along with the EP release. The video starts off with the four members against a black backdrop and red metal rods built into structures.  As the song progresses, the dance scenes are interjected with solo scenes of the members wandering around the streets of Las Vegas.  In addition, the video also contains the members at a bar, singing to the camera as a group and also at the bar looking dejected and alone.  "Alone" reached number 1 on the Gaon Charts for the week and month.  The EP charted at number 3 on the Gaon Weekly Albums Chart and number 10 on the monthly chart.  The title track went to number 1 on the weekly and monthly Gaon charts and placed third on year-end chart.

On June 28, 2012, a remix of "Alone" by DJ Smells was released on Sistar's extended play Loving U.

Singles 
"Alone" was released as the title track in conjunction with the EP on April 12, 2012. The song entered at number 4 on the Gaon Digital Chart on the chart issue dated April 8–14, 2012, with 340,659 downloads sold and 1,112,372 streams. In its second week, the song topped the chart – and the componing Download Chart with 447,718 downloads sold -, the first of two consecutive weeks at number one. This marked the group's second number one single.

The song charted at second place on the Gaon Digital Chart for April 2012 with 1,361,471 downloads sold and 9,544,009 accumulated streams. "Alone" placed at number 3 on the Gaon Digital Chart for the year 2012 with 3,203,685 downloads sold and 36,092,888 streams.

Promotion
The promotions of the song "Alone" started on April 12, on Mnet's M! Countdown. The song "Lead Me" was also performed during the first week of promotions. The song gave the group their second TV music show award on KBS's Music Bank on April 27 and the third on May 4. The song also won two Mutizens on SBS's Inkigayo, on April 29 and May 6, respectively.

Commercial performance 
Alone entered and peaked at number 3 on the Gaon Album Chart on the chart issue dated April 15–21, 2012. In its second week, the EP fell to number 38. After six consecutive weeks on the chart, the EP charted at number 81 and dropped the Top 100 the following week.

The EP sold 13,483 physicals copies in its first month, charting at number 10 on the Gaon Album Chart for the month of April 2012. The EP was the 81st best selling album of 2012 with 17,802 physical copies sold.

Track listing

Chart performance

Album chart

Sales and certifications

Music program wins

Release history

References

External links 
 

2012 debut EPs
Korean-language EPs
Sistar EPs
Starship Entertainment EPs